Ephemeropsis may refer to:
 Ephemeropsis (mayfly), a fossil genus of mayflies in the family Hexgenitidae
 Ephemeropsis (plant), a genus of mosses in the family Daltoniaceae